During the 2001–02 English football season, Bradford City competed in the First Division.

Season summary
In the 2001–02 season, Bradford had high hopes of a return to the top flight following relegation last season but it didn't materialise and on 24 December after an inconsistent run of results, boss Jim Jefferies resigned much to the chairman's fury, who branded Jefferies a "quitter". Chesterfield boss Nicky Law was then installed as their new manager on 1 January on a two-and-a-half year contract and his assistant Ian Banks joined amongst the coaching staff. Results didn't improve too much though and Bradford ended up finishing in a disappointing 15th place.

Kit
Bradford City's kit was manufactured by the club's own brand, BCFC Leisure, and sponsored by Bradford-based car dealership JCT600.

League table

Results summary

Results by round

Results
Bradford City's score comes first

Legend

Football League First Division

FA Cup

League Cup

First-team squad
Squad at end of season

Left club during season

Reserve squad

Notes

References

2001-02
Bradford City